is a Japanese actor, best known for his role as Shouichi Tsugami, the main character of the Kamen Rider series Kamen Rider Agito.

Biography
He graduated from the Hyōgo Prefectural Amagasaki North High School. Although he was originally a model in magazines, he showed interest in acting and was cast in the 2001 TV Asahi series Kamen Rider Agito. Kashu's role was the protagonist Shouichi Tsugami/Kamen Rider Agito, which raised his profile. In 2009, he reprised his role as Shouichi Tsugami/Kamen Rider Agito in the film Kamen Rider Decade: All Riders vs. Dai-Shocker.

His other notable role is playing Kazuya Kuroki in the first four seasons of the popular police procedural series Honcho Azumi from 2009 to 2011.

In 2009, Kashu began studying at Kokugakuin University's Faculty of Shinto culture department. and graduated in 2014.

On April 3, 2019, the day after shooting for his on-screen reprisal in Kamen Rider Zi-O, Kashu married a woman who worked for a real estate where they met at izakaya.

Filmography

TV series

Films

References

External links
 Oricon Style profile 

1979 births
Living people
21st-century Japanese male actors
Actors from Hyōgo Prefecture
Kamen Rider
Japanese male television actors
Japanese male film actors